The Christian Democratic Appeal (CDA) is a Christian-democratic political party in the Netherlands. It was originally formed in 1977 from a confederation of the Catholic People's Party, the Anti-Revolutionary Party and the Christian Historical Union; it has participated in all but three cabinets since it became a unitary party.

Health Minister Hugo de Jonge served as Leader of the Christian Democratic Appeal from July 2020 until his resignation the following December. Finance Minister Wopke Hoekstra was then chosen as lijstrekker for the 2021 general election, becoming the de facto party leader. After the 2017 general election, in which the party won 19 seats (third place), the CDA became a junior coalition partner in the Third Rutte cabinet with the People's Party for Freedom and Democracy, Democrats 66 and Christian Union. The Fourth Rutte cabinet was formed upon the same coalition.

History

History before 1977
Since 1880 the sizeable Catholic and Protestant parties had worked together in the so-called Coalitie. They shared a common interest in public funding of religious schools. In 1888 they formed the first Christian-democratic government, led by the Anti-Revolutionary Æneas Baron Mackay. The cooperation was not without problems and in 1894 the more anti-papist and aristocratic conservatives left the Protestant Anti-Revolutionary Party, to found the Christian Historical Union (CHU). The main issues dividing Protestants and Catholics was the position of the Dutch Representation at the Holy See and the future of the Dutch Indies.

By 1918, there were three major Christian Democratic parties in the Netherlands—the General League of Roman Catholic Caucuses, the Protestant Anti-Revolutionary Party and the Protestant Christian Historical Union. The General League evolved into the Roman Catholic State Party by 1926, and the Catholic People's Party in 1945.

From 1918 to 1967, the three Christian Democratic parties had a majority in both houses of the States General, and at least two of them were included in every cabinet. The KVP and its antecedents had been in government without interruption since 1918.

In the sixties, Dutch society became more secularised and the pillars faded, and voters began to move away from the three Christian-democratic parties. In the 1963 general election the three parties held 51% of the vote, whilst in 1972 general election they held only 32%. This decline forced the three parties to work closer together. In 1967 the Group of Eighteen was formed: it was a think-tank of six prominent politicians per party that planned the future cooperation of the three parties.

This caused progressive forces within the three parties, especially the ARP and KVP, to regret their political affiliation. In 1968 they founded the Political Party of Radicals (PPR), a left-wing party that sought cooperation with the Labour Party (PvdA). Locally and provincially however the three parties had long cooperated well, in some areas they formed one Christian-democratic parliamentary party and proposed one list of candidates. In the 1971 general election, the three parties presented a common political program, which lay the foundation for the first Biesheuvel cabinet.

After the disastrous elections of 1972 the cooperation was given new momentum. Piet Steenkamp, a member of the Senate for the KVP was appointed chairman of a council which was to lay the foundation for a federation of the three parties, and provide a common manifesto of principles. In 1973 this federation was officially formed, with Steenkamp as chairperson.

The cooperation was frustrated by the formation of the Den Uyl cabinet, established by the leader of the social-democratic PvdA and Prime Minister of the Netherlands Joop den Uyl. Den Uyl refused to allow members of the CHU in the cabinet that he would lead. This led to a situation where the CHU, ARP and KVP sat as a single faction in both houses of parliament, but only the KVP and ARP supplied ministers and junior ministers. The cabinet Den Uyl was riddled with political and personal conflicts. Another issue that split the three parties was the place that the Bible would take in the new party.

Period of prime ministerships, 1977–1994
In 1976, the three parties announced that they would field a single list at the 1977 general election under the name Christian Democratic Appeal (Christen Democratisch Appèl). The KVP minister of Justice, Dries van Agt, was the top candidate. In the election campaign he made clear the CDA was a centrist party, that would not lean to the left or to the right. The three parties were able to stabilise their proportion of the vote.

The election result forced Van Agt to start talks with Den Uyl. Although Van Agt had been Deputy Prime Minister in the cabinet Den Uyl, the two had never gotten along well. The animosity between them frustrated the talks. After more than 300 days of negotiations, they finally officially failed, and Van Agt was able to negotiate a cabinet with the conservative-liberal People's Party for Freedom and Democracy (VVD). The first Van Agt cabinet had a very narrow majority. The unexpected cabinet with the VVD led to split within the newly founded CDA between more progressive and more conservative members. The progressives remained within the party, and were known as loyalists. On 11 October 1980, the three original parties ceased to exist and the CDA was founded as a unitary party. After the 1981 general election, the VVD and the CDA lost their majority, and the CDA was forced to cooperate with the PvdA. Den Uyl became deputy prime minister under van Agt. The second Van Agt cabinet was troubled by ideological and personal conflicts, and fell after one year.

After the 1982 general election, the new CDA leader, Ruud Lubbers (formerly of the KVP), formed a majority coalition with the VVD. The first Lubbers cabinet set an ambitious reform program in motion, which included budget cuts, reform of the old age and disability pensions and liberalisation of public services. Lubbers was reelected in 1986 and in 1989. In 1989 however, the CDA only garnered a minimal majority with the VVD, which they had also gradually fallen out with during the previous cabinet, leading the CDA to instead cooperate with the PvdA in the new government. In the third Lubbers cabinet, a CDA-PvdA coalition, the ambitious reform project was continued, with some adaptations and protests from the PvdA.

Opposition to Labour, 1994–2002
The 1994 general election was fraught with problems for the CDA: personal conflicts between retiring prime minister Lubbers and lijsttrekker Elco Brinkman, a lack of support for the reforms of old age and disability pensions, and the perceived arrogance of the CDA caused a dramatic defeat at the polls. A new coalition was formed between PvdA and the liberal parties VVD and Democrats 66 (D66), consigning the CDA to opposition for the first time ever. It was also the first government without any Christian Democratic ministers since 1918. The party was marred by subsequent internal battles over leadership. The party also reflected on its principals: the party began to orient itself more toward communitarian ideals.

Balkenende cabinets, 2002–2010
During the tumultuous 2002 general election, which saw the murder of right-wing politician Pim Fortuyn, many people voted for the CDA, hoping that it could bring some stability to Dutch politics. The CDA led the first Balkenende cabinet, which included the VVD and the Pim Fortuyn List (LPF). This cabinet fell due to internal struggles within the LPF. After the 2003 general election, the Christian Democrats were forced to begin cabinet negotiations with the PvdA. Personal animosity between Balkenende and the leader of the PvdA, Wouter Bos, frustrated these negotiations. Balkenende eventually formed a coalition with the VVD and D66. The coalition proposed an ambitious program of reforms, including more restrictive immigration laws, democratisation of political institutions and reforms of the system of social security and labour laws.

After the 2006 general election the CDA changed their course radically: they formed a new fourth cabinet Balkenende still led by Balkenende, but now with the PvdA and the Christian Union (CU). The cabinet was more progressive, entailing increased government spending.

Partner in Rutte cabinets, 2010–present
In the 2010 general election the CDA lost half of its seats and came in fourth place after VVD, PvdA and the Party for Freedom (PVV). Balkenende announced his resignation and stayed prime minister until the formation and inauguration of the Rutte cabinet.

After the fall of the short-lived first Rutte cabinet in 2012, in which the CDA participated as junior coalition partners to the VVD, the party announced a leadership election. On 18 May 2012 the party announced that the leadership elections were won by Sybrand van Haersma Buma. He received more than 50 percent of the votes. The popular Mona Keijzer, the rising star within the party, received 26% of the votes and announced that she would closely collaborate with Van Haersma Buma during the election campaign prior to the Dutch general election on 12 September 2012. In that election, the CDA suffered considerable losses, falling to 13 seats. The party was excluded from the second Rutte cabinet—only the second time in its history that the party has not been in government. At the municipal elections of 19 March 2014 the CDA won 18% of all the votes and remained the largest party in Dutch municipalities.

In the 2017 general election, the CDA gained six seats to become the third largest party. It continued to remain in government as part of the third Rutte cabinet, with the VVD, D66 and CU.

On 19 March 2021, chairman Rutger Ploum resigned after the party looked to have lost 4 out 19 seats in the 2021 general election.

Ideology
The CDA is a Christian democratic party, but Christian values are seen as only one source of inspiration for individual members of the States General. The party also has Jewish, Muslim and Hindu members of parliament and favours the integration of minorities into Dutch culture.

The party has four main ideals: stewardship, solidarity, shared responsibility and public justice. Shared responsibility refers to the way society should be organised: not one organisation should control all society, instead the state, the market, and social institutions, like churches and unions should work together. This is called sphere sovereignty, a core concept of Neo-Calvinist political philosophy. Furthermore, this refers to the way the state should be organised. Not one level of the state should have total control; instead, responsibility should be shared between local, provincial, national and European governments. This is called subsidiarity in Catholic political thought. With stewardship the Christian Democrats refer to the way the planet ought to be treated: the Earth is a gift from God. Therefore, we should try to preserve our environment.

Practically, this means the CDA is a centre party. However, the party has a considerable centre-left wing, that supports eco-friendly politics, a strong pro-European policy and favours centre-left coalitions. The position of the centre-left group within the party has been weakened since the party's participation in the centre-right minority cabinet with the VVD (the first Rutte cabinet), a cabinet that strongly depended on the parliamentary support of the far-right Party for Freedom (PVV). CDA politicians that can be considered centrist or centre-left: Jack Biskop (MP), Ad Koppejan (MP), Kathleen Ferrier (MP; daughter of the late Johan Ferrier, president of Suriname 1975–1980), Dries van Agt (former Prime Minister), Ruud Lubbers (former Prime Minister) and Herman Wijffels (former chairman of the Social Economic Council, former informateur).

In the past Maxime Verhagen, then informal leader of the CDA and deputy Prime Minister, strongly denied the claim that the CDA is a right-wing party. Verhagen made it clear to the media that his party is a centrist and moderate party and that the CDA participates in a centre-right coalition (with the People's Party for Freedom and Democracy (VVD) as the right-wing component and the CDA as the centrist component). However, his former colleague in the cabinet, minister of Defence Hans Hillen, was a strong proponent of a conservative CDA.

The state deficit should be repaid in one generation to cope with the effects of the aging population.
The toleration of soft drugs should come to an end and the practices of prostitution, abortion and euthanasia should be more limited.
The party is a staunch proponent of European integration and Turkey's possible EU membership in the future.
The party wants to make schools and hospitals more responsible for their own policy instead of being regulated by the government.

New party course
At a congress on 21 January 2012 the party adopted a centrist course, dubbed by former minister of Social Affairs Aart-Jan de Geus as "radical centrist" ("het radicale midden"). The party explicitly abandoned its former center-right course. Despite this, the party continued its coalition with the centre-right VVD of Prime Minister Mark Rutte and the Party for Freedom of Geert Wilders until the government collapsed later in the year. The so-called Strategic Council, which was formed in 2011 and headed by former minister Aart-Jan de Geus, that worked on a report to redifine the party course, advised the following:
limiting the so-called home mortgage interest deduction;
introduction of flat tax;
eco-friendly policy (ecotax);
a pro-European policy;
a more friendly immigration policy;
equal chances for every person;
more investment in higher education;
and a modern social policy.

In 2014, Leader Van Haersma Buma announced that the party is now officially in favour of directly elected mayors, although a large majority of its members are opposed to elected mayors.

Electoral results

House of Representatives

Senate

 11 seats as a stand-alone party.

European Parliament

Representation

Members of the Fourth Rutte cabinet

Members of the House of Representatives

Current members 
Current members of the House of Representatives since the 2021 election:

 Pieter Heerma, Parliamentary leader
 René Peters
 Jaco Geurts
 Inge van Dijk
 Raymond Knops
 Evert Jan Slootweg
 Agnes Mulder

 Mustafa Amhaouch
 Lucille Werner
 Joba van den Berg-Jansen
 Hilde Palland
 Derk Boswijk 
 Henri Bontenbal 

Pieter Omtzigt exited the party on 12 June 2021.

Predecessors' seats 
Seats in the House of Representatives:
1956– (KVP 49, ARP 15, CHU 13)
1959– (KVP 49, ARP 14, CHU 12)
1963– (KVP 50, ARP 13, CHU 13)
1967– (KVP 43, ARP 15, CHU 12)
1971– (KVP 35, ARP 13, CHU 10)
1972– (KVP 27, ARP 14, CHU 7)
1977– (CDA)

Members of the Senate

Current members 
Current members of the Senate since the 2019 election:

 , Parliamentary leader
 Joop Atsma
 
 
 Ria Oomen-Ruijten

 
 
 
 Jonathan Soeharno

Predecessors' seats 
Seats in the Senate:
1956– (KVP 25, ARP 8, CHU 8)
1959– (KVP 26, ARP 8, CHU 8)
1963– (KVP 26, ARP 7, CHU 7)
1966– (KVP 25, ARP 7, CHU 7)
1969– (KVP 24, ARP 7, CHU 8)
1971– (KVP 22, ARP 7, CHU 7)
1974– (KVP 16, ARP 6, CHU 7)
1977– (CDA)

Members of the European Parliament 
The CDA has been a member of the European People's Party (EPP) since its founding in 1976; CDA MEPs sit in the EPP group.

Current members 
Current members of the European Parliament since the 2019 election:

4 seats: 
 Esther de Lange (top candidate)
 Annie Schreijer-Pierik
 Jeroen Lenaers
 Tom Berendsen

Local and provincial government 
By far, the CDA has the most members of municipal and provincial councils in the Netherlands. Furthermore, it cooperates in most municipal and provincial governments.

Electorate 

The CDA is mainly supported by religious voters, both Catholics and Protestants. These tend to live in rural areas and tend to be elderly. In some periods, however, the CDA has functioned as a centrist party, attracting people from all classes and religions.

Geographically, the CDA is particularly strong in the provinces of North Brabant, Limburg and Overijssel and in the Veluwe and the Westland areas. In the 2006 elections the CDA received the highest percentage of votes in the municipality of Tubbergen, Overijssel (66,59% of the vote). The CDA is weaker in the four major cities (Amsterdam, Rotterdam, The Hague and Utrecht) and in Groningen and Drenthe.

Organisation

Leadership 

 Leaders
 Dries van Agt (10 December 1976 – 25 October 1982)
 Ruud Lubbers (25 October 1982 – 29 January 1994)
 Elco Brinkman (29 January 1994 – 16 August 1994)
 Enneüs Heerma (16 August 1994 – 27 March 1997)
 Jaap de Hoop Scheffer (27 March 1997 – 1 October 2001)
 Dr. Jan Peter Balkenende (1 October 2001 – 9 June 2010)
 Maxime Verhagen (9 June 2010 – 30 June 2012)
 Sybrand van Haersma Buma (30 June 2012 – 22 May 2019)
 Vacant (22 May 2019 – 15 July 2020)
 Hugo de Jonge (15 July 2020 – 10 December 2020)
 Wopke Hoekstra (since 11 December 2020)

 Chairmen
Dr. Piet Steenkamp (23 June 1973 – 11 October 1980)
 Piet Bukman (11 October 1980 – 14 July 1986)
 Wim van Velzen (31 January 1987 – 7 March 1994)
 Tineke Lodders (7 March 1994 – 4 February 1995)
 Hans Helgers (4 February 1995 – 27 February 1999)
 Marnix van Rij (27 February 1999 – 10 October 2001)
 Dr. Bert de Vries (10 October 2001 – 2 November 2002)
 Marja van Bijsterveldt (2 November 2002 – 22 February 2007)
 Peter van Heeswijk (2 June 2007 – 10 June 2010)
 Dr. Henk Bleker (10 June 2010 – 14 October 2010)
 Liesbeth Spies (1 November 2010 – 2 April 2011)
 Ruth Peetoom (2 April 2011 – 9 February 2019)
 Rutger Ploum (9 February 2019 – 19 March 2021)
 Marnix van Rij (3 April 2021 – 11 December 2021)
 Hans Huibers (since 11 December 2021)

 Parliamentary leaders in the Senate
 Dr. Johan van Hulst (8 June 1977 – 10 June 1981)
 Dr. Jan Christiaanse (10 June 1981 – 25 October 1988)
 Ad Kaland (25 October 1988 – 1 January 1994)
 Dr. Luck van Leeuwen (1 January 1994 – 8 June 1999)
 Gerrit Braks (8 June 1999 – 2 October 2001)
 Yvonne Timmerman-Buck (2 October 2001 – 17 June 2003)
 Jos Werner (1 July 2003 – 7 June 2011)
 Elco Brinkman (7 June 2011 – 11 June 2019)
 Dr. Ben Knapen (11 June 2019 – 24 September 2021)
 Niek Jan van Kesteren (since 28 September 2021)

 Parliamentary leaders in the House of Representatives
 Dries van Agt (8 June 1977 – 19 December 1977)
 Willem Aantjes (19 December 1977 – 7 November 1978)
 Ruud Lubbers (7 November 1978 – 10 June 1981)
 Dries van Agt (10 June 1981 – 24 August 1981)
 Ruud Lubbers (24 Augustus 1981 – 4 November 1982)
 Dr. Bert de Vries (4 November 1982 – 3 June 1986)
 Ruud Lubbers (3 June 1986 – 14 July 1986)
 Dr. Bert de Vries (14 July 1986 – 14 September 1989)
 Ruud Lubbers (14 September 1989 – 7 November 1989)
 Elco Brinkman (7 November 1989 – 16 August 1994)
 Enneüs Heerma (16 Augustus 1994 – 27 March 1997)
 Jaap de Hoop Scheffer (27 March 1997 – 1 October 2001)
 Dr. Jan Peter Balkenende (1 October 2001 – 11 July 2002)
 Maxime Verhagen (11 July 2002 – 30 January 2003)
 Dr. Jan Peter Balkenende (30 January 2003 – 21 May 2003)
 Maxime Verhagen (21 May 2003 – 30 November 2006)
 Dr. Jan Peter Balkenende (30 November 2006 – 9 February 2007)
 Maxime Verhagen (9 February 2007 – 22 February 2007)
 Pieter van Geel (22 February 2007 – 17 June 2010)
 Maxime Verhagen (17 June 2010 – 14 October 2010)
 Sybrand van Haersma Buma (14 October 2010 – 21 May 2019)
 Pieter Heerma (21 May 2019 – 31 March 2021)
 Wopke Hoekstra (31 March 2021 – 10 January 2022)
 Pieter Heerma (since – 10 January 2022)

 Lijsttrekker – General election
 Dries van Agt – 1977, 1981, 1982
 Ruud Lubbers – 1986, 1989
 Elco Brinkman – 1994
 Jaap de Hoop Scheffer – 1998
 Dr. Jan Peter Balkenende – 2002, 2003, 2006, 2010
 Sybrand van Haersma Buma – 2012, 2017
 Wopke Hoekstra – 2021

Linked organisations 
The youth movement of the CDA is the Christian Democratic Youth Appeal (CDJA). The CDA publishes a monthly magazine, and its scientific bureau publishes the Christian Democratic Explorations (Christen-Democratische Verkenningen).

As an effect of pillarisation, the CDA still has many personal and ideological ties with religious organisations, such as the broadcasting societies KRO and NCRV, the newspaper Trouw, the employers organisations NCW and the union CNV.

The CDA participates in the Netherlands Institute for Multiparty Democracy, a democracy assistance organisation of seven Dutch political parties.

International organisations
The CDA is a member of the European People's Party and the Centrist Democrat International.

See also 
 Abraham Kuyper

Further reading

References

External links 

Documentation Centre Dutch Political Parties about CDA (in Dutch)

 
1980 establishments in the Netherlands
Confessional parties in the Netherlands
Member parties of the European People's Party
Organisations based in The Hague
Political parties established in 1980